San Giorgio Scarampi is a comune (municipality) in the Province of Asti in the Italian region Piedmont, located about  southeast of Turin and about  south of Asti.

San Giorgio Scarampi borders the following municipalities: Olmo Gentile, Perletto, Roccaverano, and Vesime. It is home to a tall medieval tower, with six floors, commanding the Val Bormida landscape.

References

External links
 Official website

Cities and towns in Piedmont